The Kuytun–Tacheng Expressway, commonly referred to as the Kuita Expressway is an expressway that connects the cities of Kuytun and Tacheng in the Chinese autonomous region of Xinjiang. The expressway is a spur or auxiliary line of the  G30 Lianyungang–Khorgas Expressway. In the southeastern end, it connects to the G30 Lianyungang–Khorgas Expressway at Kuytun. In the northwestern end, it terminates at Xinjiang Provincial Highway 221 in Tacheng, close to the Bakhtu border crossing on the China–Kazakhstan border.

Description
The expressway comprises two sections. The first section between Kuytun and Karamay is known as the Kuytun–Karamay Expressway, or Kuike Expressway for short. It opened on October 13, 2012, and is also designated as part of the G3014 Kuytun–Altay Expressway. 

The second section from Karamay to Tacheng is known as the Karamay–Tacheng Expressway, or Keta Expressway for short. It opened on November 30, 2014.

References

Expressways in Xinjiang
Chinese national-level expressways